"Fool" is a 1973 song by Elvis Presley. It was adapted by songwriter Carl Sigman from a composition by James Last, titled "No Words". It was released as a single with the flipside track "Steamroller Blues". and then on the 1973 album Elvis (as its opening track).

On Billboard Hot 100 the single charted as "Steamroller Blues / Fool", peaking at number 17 on the week of June 2, 1973. "Fool" also charted on the Billboard Easy Listening chart, spending there 16 weeks in total and peaking at number 12 on the same week of June 2.

In the United Kingdom the single "Fool" spent 10 weeks on the UK Singles Chart, peaking at number 15 on the week of August 11, 1973.

Critical response 
Billboard reviewed the single in its April 7, 1973 issue, calling it a "[s]trong ballad effort in country-rock vein, following along lines of [Presley's] other ballad hits." The magazine also noted the "good [chart] potential" of the flip side ("Steamroller Blues" by James Taylor).

Charts 

 * as "Steamroller Blues / Fool"

References

External links 
 Elvis Presley - Fool / Steamroller Blues at Discogs
 U.S. vinyl release at Discogs

1970s ballads
1973 songs
1973 singles
Country ballads
Elvis Presley songs
RCA Records singles
Rock ballads
Songs written by Carl Sigman
Songs with music by James Last